Jo Morris is an English international lawn and indoor bowler.

In 2007, she won the mixed pairs title at the 2007 World Indoor Bowls Championship with Greg Harlow.

References

English female bowls players
Living people
Year of birth missing (living people)
Indoor Bowls World Champions